Miriam Soledad Raudez Rodríguez is a Nicaraguan politician who is currently serving as Minister of Education, Culture and Sports in the Government of Nicaragua.

References 

Living people
Year of birth missing (living people)
Place of birth missing (living people)
21st-century Nicaraguan politicians
21st-century Nicaraguan women politicians
Ministers of Education of Nicaragua
Culture ministers of Nicaragua
Women government ministers of Nicaragua